Charity You're a Star (initially known as You're a Star Charity Special) is a talent contest created by Raidió Teilifís Éireann (RTÉ), in which various Irish celebrities sang to raise money for the charity of their choice. The show was aired live from Dublin City University's theatre, The Helix.

The first (2005) season was named You're a Star Charity Special, which was conceived to be a variation of parent programme You're a Star. However it was more successful that originally thought, so subsequent seasons (in 2006 and 2007) were called Charity You're a Star to imply more independence and permanence.

You're a Star Charity Special
On Tuesday 2 August 2005 (at 21.30 IST), the You're a Star Charity Special made its debut. The special contained eight Irish celebrity contestants who were coached by Twink, the Irish pantomime star. The judging panel consisted of Louis Walsh, Linda Martin and Sunday Independent columnist Brendan O'Connor. The special was presented for two weeks by Derek Mooney.

Contestants

On the night of the final (14 August 2005), David Mitchell defeated Finian McGrath via the Irish public vote and won the contest.

Charity You're a Star, second season

Due to the success of the first season, RTÉ and the producers (Screentime ShinAwiL) brought the show back for a second season. There was no change to the judges, presenters or coach. However, unlike the first season, there were ten acts and ten live episodes. Episodes ran from Saturday 29 July until Sunday 13 August 2006. Each night one celebrity was eliminated as a result of receiving the fewest votes from the public.

Contestants

The final was held on 13 August 2006. The remaining two celebrities were Áine Ní Dhroighneáin and John Aldridge, with Aldridge winning. This was the second time in a row that the person representing Temple Street Children's Hospital won the competition.

Charity You're a Star, third season
The 2007 season saw a change in personnel: Brian Ormond hosted, while the judges were Brendan O'Connor, Amanda Brunker and Bryan McFadden.

The final was held on 12 August 2007. The remaining two celebrities acts were Seán Bán Breathnach and The All Stars. The All Stars were the winners, performing "You Can Leave Your Hat On". The programme raised a record total of €384,520 for the ten Irish charities during its run.

References

External links
 Official website
 

2005 Irish television series debuts
2005 Irish television series endings
2006 Irish television series debuts
2006 Irish television series endings
2007 Irish television series debuts
2007 Irish television series endings
Irish talent shows
Irish variety television shows
Singing talent shows
You're a Star